Jean Schopfer (28 May 1868 – 9 January 1931) was a tennis player competing for France, and a writer, known under the pseudonym of Claude Anet. He reached two singles finals at the Amateur French Championships, winning in 1892 over British player Fassitt, and losing in 1893 to Laurent Riboulet.

Biography 
Schopfer was born 28 May 1868, Morges, Switzerland.

Educated at the Sorbonne and the École du Louvre, Schopfer started writing in 1899. Under the name Claude Anet, Schopfer published many books, including La Révolution Russe, written after a trip to Russia during World War I, Mayerling, based on the Mayerling Incident, and Simon Kra, a biography of tennis player Suzanne Lenglen.

His 1920 novel Ariane, jeune fille russe has been adapted into a number of films including Ariane and Love in the Afternoon.

He died on 9 January 1931 in Paris.

References

External links

 
 
 
 

19th-century French people
19th-century male tennis players
French journalists
French male tennis players
French people of Swiss descent
People from Morges
University of Paris alumni
1868 births
1931 deaths
French male non-fiction writers